The Five Eulsa Traitors refer to the five officials serving under Emperor Gojong who signed the Eulsa Treaty of 1905, which made Korea a protectorate of Japan.  The five officials were Education Minister Yi Wan-yong, Army Minister Yi Geun-taek, Interior Minister , Foreign Affairs Minister Park Je-sun, and Agriculture, Commerce, and Industry Minister Gwon Jung-hyeon.

Prime Minister Han Kyu-seol and the ministers of finance and justice strongly opposed the treaty, but they and the politically weakened Gojong were unable to effectively resist the Five, even though the Emperor refused to sign the treaty himself, an act required to bring the treaty to conclusion under Korean law. The Japanese government forced Prime Minister Han to step down and installed Park in his place.

Widespread public dissatisfaction at the treaty was directed at the five ministers, and an "assassination group" was formed targeting the five. Yi Ji-yong's house was burned in the same year. Gwon Jung-hyeon was injured in an attack in 1907, and Yi Wan-yong was seriously injured in an assassination attempt in 1909.

In 2005, the  identified the names of the five officials responsible for the Eulsa Treaty, as part of its efforts to compile a directory of individual Koreans who had collaborated with the Japanese before and during its colonial rule.

See also 
 Chinilpa - a word that described people who collaborated with the Japanese during its occupation of Korea
 Anti-Japanese sentiment in Korea

External links 
 Research Center for National Issues (민족문제연구소) – Korean language site.
 Chosun-Japanese Treates, 1904–1910 
 Book review of Korea and the Politics of Imperialism, 1876–1910, by C. I. Eugene Kim and Kim Han-kyo – James B. Palais, The Journal of Asian Studies, Vol. 28, No. 4, pp. 863–864.
 민족문제연구소 – Wikipedia article in Korean
 "Watch How You Use 'Traitor'", JoongAng Ilbo 2001.08.30

Korean Empire
Korean collaborators with Imperial Japan
Korean politicians
Traitors in history